Germencik railway station is a railway station in Germencik, Turkey. It is located adjacent to the D.550 state highway, known as Atatürk Avenue within the town. TCDD Taşımacılık operates regional train service from İzmir and Söke to Nazilli and Denizli, via Aydın.

Germencik station was built in 1866 by the Ottoman Railway Company as part of their railway from İzmir to Aydın. Germencik became a major center for the production of olive oil once the railway was built and exported it to the outside world via the station.

References

External links
TCDD Taşımacılık

Railway stations in Aydın Province
Railway stations opened in 1866
1866 establishments in the Ottoman Empire